The following lists events that happened during 1925 in Australia.

Incumbents

Monarch – George V
Governor-General – Henry Forster, 1st Baron Forster (until 8 October) then John Baird, 1st Viscount Stonehaven
Prime Minister – Stanley Bruce
Chief Justice – Adrian Knox

State premiers
Premier of New South Wales – George Fuller (until 17 June), then Jack Lang
Premier of Queensland – Ted Theodore (until 26 February), then William Gillies (until 22 October), then William McCormack
Premier of South Australia – John Gunn
Premier of Tasmania – Joseph Lyons
Premier of Victoria – John Allan
Premier of Western Australia – Philip Collier

State governors
Governor of New South Wales – Sir Dudley de Chair
Governor of Queensland – Sir Matthew Nathan (until 17 September)
Governor of South Australia – Sir Tom Bridges
Governor of Tasmania – Sir James O'Grady
Governor of Victoria – George Rous, 3rd Earl of Stradbroke
Governor of Western Australia – Sir William Campion

Events
26 January – Australia's oldest commercial radio station, 2UE, begins broadcasting in Sydney.
20 May – The Murrumbidgee River floods for eight days killing four people, as up to  falls in its upper catchment.
30 May – Millicent Preston-Stanley becomes the first woman member of the New South Wales Legislative Assembly.
3 June – A general election is held in Tasmania. The Labor government of Joseph Lyons is returned in a landslide victory.
9 June – Ten people are killed in a derailment near Traveston railway station, Queensland
1 September – Thomas Blamey becomes Chief Commissioner of Victoria Police.

Science and technology
 The Cactoblastis moth is introduced in Queensland to control prickly pear cactus.

Arts and literature

 John Longstaff wins the Archibald Prize for his portrait of Maurice Moscovitch

Sport
 Victoria wins the Sheffield Shield
2 May – Footscray, Hawthorn and North Melbourne play their initial Victorian Football League matches.
8 August – South Sydney record the only perfect season in NSWRFL history, winning all twelve of their matches.
26 September – Geelong defeats Collingwood 10.19 (79) to 9.15 (69), becoming premiers of the 1925 VFL season.
3 November – Windbag wins the Melbourne Cup.

Births
8 February – Francis Webb, poet (d. 1973)
10 February – Basil Hennessy, archaeologist (d. 2013)
11 February – George Avery, Olympic triple jumper (d. 2006)
12 February – Ted Innes, politician (d. 2010)
17 February – Joy Nichols, comedian and actress (d. 1992)
20 February – Pat Lanigan, public servant (d. 1992)
19 March – Creighton Burns, journalist and editor-in-chief of The Age (d. 2008)
27 March – Ian Robinson, politician (d. 2017)
4 April – Dorothy Alison, actress (d. 1992)
21 April – Anthony Mason, Chief Justice of the High Court
2 May – Lou Rowan, Test cricket match umpire (d. 2017)
19 May – Brian Moll, character actor, director and producer (d. 2010)
24 May – Alfred Parsons, diplomat (d. 2010)
4 June – Peter Benjamin Graham, artist (d. 1987)
9 June – Don Ritchie, Australian official (d. 2012)
3 July – Terry Moriarty, Australian rules footballer (d. 2011)
6 July – Ruth Cracknell, actor (d. 2002)
18 July
Raymond Jones, architect (d. 2022)
Shirley Strickland, athlete (d. 2004)
26 July – Neil O'Reilly, Australian rules footballer (d. 1985) 
19 August – Laurie Sawle, cricketer (d. 2022)
21 August – Don Chipp, politician and founder of the Australian Democrats (d. 2006)
24 August – Duncan Hall, rugby league footballer of the 1940s and 1950s (d. 2011)
27 August – Fred Emery, psychologist (d. 1997)
27 August – Ken Grieves, cricketer (d. 1992)
27 August – Bill Neilson, Premier of Tasmania (1975–1977) (d. 1989)
24 September – Harry Jenkins (senior), politician (d. 2004)
4 October – Renfrey Potts, mathematician (d. 2005)
5 October – Murray Riley, Olympic rower (d. 2020)
18 October – Thomas Millar, historian (d. 1994)
24 October – Ken Mackay, cricketer (d. 1982)
5 November – Rhonda Small, filmmaker (d. 2014)
17 November – Charles Mackerras, conductor (d. 2010)
23 November – James Killen, politician (d. 2007)
10 December – Norm McDonald, Australian rules footballer (d. 2002)

Deaths

 24 January – William Aitcheson Haswell, zoologist (born in the United Kingdom) (b. 1854)
 4 February – Richard Godfrey Rivers, artist (born and died in the United Kingdom) (b. 1859)
 23 February – John Holman, Western Australian politician (b. 1872)
 1 March – John Ferguson, minister (born in the United Kingdom) (b. 1852)
 16 April – Thomas McCawley, 5th Chief Justice of Queensland (b. 1881)
 20 April – Rose Scott, suffragette (b. 1847)
 28 April – Sir Richard Butler, 23rd Premier of South Australia (born and died in the United Kingdom) (b. 1850)
 22 June – Matthew Gibney, bishop (born in Ireland) (b. 1835)
 27 June – Simpson Newland, South Australian politician, pastoralist and author (born in the United Kingdom) (b. 1835)
 18 July – Edward Russell, Victorian politician (b. 1878)
 26 July – William Trenwith, 1st Leader of the Victorian Labor Party (b. 1846)
 30 August – Magnus Cromarty, New South Wales politician (b. 1875)
 5 September – Reginald Augustus Frederick Murray, geologist and surveyor (born in the United Kingdom) (b. 1846)
 28 September – Joseph Brown, Victorian politician (born in the United Kingdom) (b. 1844)
 3 October – Charles Web Gilbert, sculptor (b. 1867)
 24 October – Charles Kenningham, opera singer and actor (born in the United Kingdom) (b. 1860)
 4 November – Paddy Hannan, prospector (born in Ireland) (b. 1840)
 13 November – Charles McDonald, Queensland politician (b. 1860)
 16 November – Joseph Maiden, botanist (born in the United Kingdom) (b. 1859)

See also
 List of Australian films of the 1920s

References

 
Australia
Years of the 20th century in Australia